Omocyrius jansoni is a species of beetle in the family Cerambycidae. It was described by Ritsema in 1888. It is known from Borneo.

References

Lamiinae
Beetles described in 1888